Dr. Awang Haji Ismail bin Omar Abdul Aziz was the first state mufti of Brunei under the Ministry of Religious Affairs office, later State Mufti Office. He was a Malaysian expatriate ulema (a native Johorean Malay) and held many important posts in Johore. He became the State Mufti of Brunei in 1962 under the terms of 3 years. In 1965, he still stayed as the State Mufti until his death in 1994. He died in Raja Isteri Pengiran Anak Saleha Hospital at Bandar Seri Begawan, Brunei Darussalam.

He had declared many Fatwas during those years, one of which was the banning of selling alcoholic drinks. Thus, he was well known among the Muslims in the region as The Sunni Defender.

References

State Muftis of Brunei
1911 births
Malaysian expatriates in Brunei
1994 deaths
People from Johor
Malaysian people of Malay descent